The Division of Coolgardie was an Australian electoral division in Western Australia. The division was proclaimed in 1900, and was one of the original 65 divisions to be contested at the first federal election. It was abolished in 1913. It was named for the gold-mining centre of Coolgardie, on which it was based. It was a safe seat for the Australian Labor Party.

Members

Election results

1901 establishments in Australia
Constituencies established in 1901
Constituencies disestablished in 1913
1913 disestablishments in Australia
Coolgardie
Federal politics in Western Australia
Coolgardie, Western Australia